Randy Thompson is a Virginia based americana/country music singer and songwriter. He is a resident of the Clifton, Virginia area.

He has toured in France, Norway, Austria, United Kingdom, Germany, Switzerland and the United States.
As of 2018 he has released 6 albums; 4 have reached the top 40 on US charts.
In The Rain – 1988
Wearin Blue – 1998 (Jackpot Records 1001)
That's Not Me – 2004 (Jackpot Records 1105)
Further On – 2008 (Jackpot Records)
Collected – 2012 (Jackpot Records)
War, Peace, Love, Fear – 2017 (Jackpot Records)

Chart success
#6 Freeform Americana Roots (FAR Chart #105, April 2008)
#28 Americana Music Chart (The Nielson Co., April 2008)
#12 Roots Music Report (April 2008)
#26 XM Cross Country Chart (March 30, 2008)
#16 Euro Americama Chart (June 2008)
#5 European Hotdisc Chart (For Single Ol' 97, March 2008)
#3 European Hotdisc Chart (For Single Further On, December 2008)
#1 European Hotdisc Independent Chart (For Single Further On, December 4, 2008)

References

American country singer-songwriters
Living people
Year of birth missing (living people)
People from Clifton, Virginia